Manfred is an unincorporated community in Wells County, North Dakota, United States. The Vang Evangelical Lutheran Church, which is listed on the National Register of Historic Places, is located in Manfred.

References

Unincorporated communities in Wells County, North Dakota
Unincorporated communities in North Dakota